The West Papua football team is a team from the Indonesian western half of the island of Western New Guinea. It is a member of ConIFA, having previously been a member of the NF-Board. On June 23, 2005, the West Papua national football team played in the 2005 UNPO Cup in The Hague. They played only one match against South Moluccas. They drew (1–1), and South Moluccas won on penalties. West Papuans were listed to take part in the 2006 VIVA World Cup but then withdrew.

The national team returned to action in 2019, playing a friendly against East Turkestan, for the first time after 14 years hiatus. On 25 January 2020, the F.A.W.P. was accepted in to ConIFA as its full member.

Football Association West Papua

The Football Association West Papua is the football association of West Papua and was founded in 2017.

Tournament records

Matches played

References

External links 
 West Papua in Fedefutbol.net 
 November 1999 version website
 2017 version website

Asian national and official selection-teams not affiliated to FIFA
Football team
CONIFA member associations